The Whitehorse Basin cutthroat trout refers to a population segment of  the cutthroat trout complex (Oncorhynchus clarkii) from the streams of the Whitehorse Basin (or the Coyote Basin), southeastern Oregon. It is alternatively considered as a part of the Lahontan cutthroat trout subspecies (Oncorhynchus clarkii henshawi),  or of the Humboldt cutthroat trout (O. c. humboldtensis) whose main range is in Nevada.

Notes

Further reading
 

Whitehorse Basin cutthroat trout
Cold water fish
Fish of the Western United States
Freshwater fish of the United States
Fauna of the Great Basin
Endemic fauna of Oregon